William Cheruiyot Sigei (born 11 October 1969 in Cheboi'ngong' village, just outside Kapsimotwo village, Bomet, Kenya) is a former Kenyan long-distance runner who won the IAAF World Cross Country Championships in 1993 and 1994. In 1994 he a set a new world record over 10,000 metres in Oslo with 26:52.23 minutes.

Today he is ranked thirty seventh of all times over 10,000 metres. The current world record is 26:11.00 minutes, and belongs to Joshua Cheptegei of Uganda.

References

External links

1969 births
Living people
People from Bomet County
Kenyan male long-distance runners
World Athletics Cross Country Championships winners
World Athletics Championships athletes for Kenya
World record setters in athletics (track and field)
Kenyan male cross country runners